The 2010 Currie Cup First Division was contested from 16 July through to 15 October 2010.  The tournament (also known as the Absa Currie Cup First Division for sponsorship reasons) is the second tier of South Africa's premier domestic rugby union competition, featuring teams representing either entire provinces or substantial regions within provinces.

Competition

Regular season and title playoffs
There were 6 participating teams in the 2010 Currie Cup First Division. These teams played each other twice over the course of the season, once at home and once away.

Teams received four points for a win and two points for a draw. Bonus points were awarded to teams that score 4 or more tries in a game, as well as to teams losing a match by 7 points or less. Teams were ranked by points, then points difference (points scored less points conceded).

The top 4 teams qualified for the title play-offs. In the semifinals, the team that finished first had home advantage against the team that finished fourth, while the team that finished second had home advantage against the team that finished third. The winners of these semi-finals played each other in the final, at the home venue of the higher-placed team.

Promotion playoffs
The top 2 teams on the log also qualified for the promotion/relegation play-offs. The first placed team played off against the team placed eighth in the 2010 Currie Cup Premier Division and the second placed team played off against the team placed seventh in the Premier Division. The winners of these two ties (determined via two team tables, with all Currie Cup ranking regulations in effect) qualified for the 2011 Currie Cup Premier Division, while the losing teams qualified for the 2011 Currie Cup First Division.

Teams

Changes from 2009
The  left the league, having won promotion to the 2010 Currie Cup Premier Division.
The  joined the league, having been relegated from the 2009 Currie Cup Premier Division.
The  changed their name to  just before the Regular Season started.

Team Listing

Table

Fixtures and results

 Fixtures are subject to change.
 All times are South African (GMT+2).

Regular season

Round one

!align=centre colspan=100|Byes
|- bgcolor="#FFFFFF"
| 
|

Round two

Round three

!align=centre colspan=100|Byes
|- bgcolor="#FFFFFF"
| 
|

Round four

Round Five

!align=centre colspan=100|Byes
|- bgcolor="#FFFFFF"
| 
|

Round Six

Round Seven

!align=centre colspan=100|Byes
|- bgcolor="#FFFFFF"
| 
|

Round Eight

Round Nine

!align=centre colspan=100|Byes
|- bgcolor="#FFFFFF"
| 
|

Round Ten

Round Eleven

!align=centre colspan=100|Byes
|- bgcolor="#FFFFFF"
| 
|

Round Twelve

Title play-off games

Semi-finals

Final

Top scorers
The following sections contain only points and tries which have been scored in competitive games in the 2010 Currie Cup First Division.

Top points scorers

Last updated: 15 October 2010Source: South African Rugby Union

Top try scorers

Last updated: 15 October 2010Source: South African Rugby Union

See also
 2010 Currie Cup Premier Division
 2010 Vodacom Cup

References

 Currie Cup
 ABSA

External links
 
 

2010
2010 Currie Cup